is an annual fine arts festival in Tokyo, Japan which has been running since 1975.

Showing artists
The festival has hosted works by many artists, including the following. 
Mayumi Aoki
Junko Arima
Yasunori Asakawa
Masahiro Hosoyamada
Aiko Kurihara
Teruaki Miura
Reiko Hashimoto
Tesshin Saitō
Junpei Satoh
Setsuko Suzuki
Hiroyuki Uchida (ja)
Makoto Watanabe

External links
Tokyoten official site

Arts in Japan
Culture in Tokyo
Tourist attractions in Tokyo
1975 in art
1975 establishments in Japan